Sacro GRA (Italian for "Holy GRA") is a 2013 Italian documentary film directed by Gianfranco Rosi. It won the Golden Lion at the 70th Venice International Film Festival. It was the first documentary film to win the award at the Venice Festival.

Synopsis
The film depicts life along the Grande Raccordo Anulare, the ring-road highway that circles Rome. Rosi spent over two years in filming, while the film's editing required eight months of work. According to the director, the film was inspired by Italo Calvino's novel Invisible Cities (1972), in which the explorer Marco Polo is imagined describing his travels to the Emperor of China Kublai Khan.

Reception
The review aggregator Rotten Tomatoes gives it a score of 76% based on 21 reviews.

Matt Zoller Seitz of RogerEbert.com gave it 3.5/4 stars, noting that it seems "scattered and incomplete at times" but also that the "movie lingers in the imagination." He praised the "beauty" of the cinematography and commented that much interpretation is left to the viewer. 

In contrast, Jay Weissberg of Variety argued that "the idea remains more absorbing than the final product" and suggested that it was ideal fodder for documentary film festivals.

References

External links
 
 

2013 films
2013 documentary films
Italian documentary films
2010s Italian-language films
Golden Lion winners
Films set in Rome
Films shot in Rome
Ring roads in Italy
Documentary films about road transport
Films directed by Gianfranco Rosi
Transport in Rome
2010s Italian films